This list of tallest buildings in Sacramento ranks buildings in Sacramento, California, including West Sacramento, by height. Compared to other cities in the United States and California, Sacramento's skyline is not as tall nor diverse, with a total of 19 skyscrapers exceeding 215 feet. In addition, no skyscrapers exceed 430 feet or are in the top 75 of the tallest buildings in California.

The history of skyscrapers in Sacramento began with the Citizen Hotel and the Elks Tower, which were both built in 1925. After this, Sacramento saw a 59-year drought without a skyscraper being built, ending with the construction of the West America Bank building in 1984. During the 1980s and 1990s, Sacramento saw a building boom, with 8 skyscrapers being built including the Wells Fargo Center, the tallest building in the city at 423 feet. However, Sacramento has seen another construction drought during the 21st century, with only 2 skyscrapers exceeding 350 feet being built since 2000. There were many highrise residential and office towers proposed for Sacramento's downtown, however a majority of proposed towers, most notably the Towers on Capitol Mall, were cancelled due to the Great Recession and higher construction costs.

Tallest buildings 
This lists ranks Sacramento buildings that stand at least 200 feet (61 m) tall, based on standard height measurement. This includes spires and architectural details but does not include antenna masts. Existing structures are included for ranking purposes based on present height.

Tallest under construction, approved or proposed
This lists ranks projects-developments Sacramento buildings that stand at least 175 feet (53 m) tall, based on standard height measurement.

References
General
Emporis.com - Sacramento
Specific

 
Sacramento
Sacramento